Koputaroa railway station was a station at Koputaroa in Horowhenua District on the North Island Main Trunk in New Zealand.

Name 
The Ministry for Culture and Heritage gives a translation of "long snare for catching parakeets" for Koputaroa. On 29 February 1906 the name of station was changed from Kereru to Koputarua, to avoid confusion with Kereru in Hawkes Bay. On 15 April 1909 the spelling was corrected from Koputarua to Koputaroa.

History 
Kereru was opened as a flag station by the Wellington and Manawatu Railway Company on Monday 2 August 1886, when trains started to run between Longburn and Ōtaki, though a special train had run from Longburn to Ohau in April 1886. The first through train from Wellington to Palmerston North ran on 30 November 1886.

In 1906 the cattle yards were rebuilt and a new goods shed and sheep stage added. When New Zealand Railways Department took over in 1908, tablet signalling was introduced. From 1889 to 1915 there was a Post Office at the station, operated by a ganger. A post office was also mentioned in 1926. A railway house was built in 1927.

Old buildings were removed in 1968. By 1981 Koputaroa had no outward traffic and the only inward freight was fertiliser to a bulk store; in 1905 Manawatu Gorge Lime Co Ltd had applied for a private siding. In 1990 a small shed remained on the west side of the line.

Incidents 
On 24 June 1910 a UD class locomotive and 3 coaches of the New Plymouth mail train were derailed, though, as the train was travelling slowly, there were no injuries. It took all weekend to clear the line and a diversionary track was laid to allow trains to pass. Incorrectly set points at the passing loop were thought to have caused the Incident.

References

External links 

 1888 photo of shelter and line
Photo of post office, with station building in the background

Defunct railway stations in New Zealand
Buildings and structures in Manawatū-Whanganui
Rail transport in Manawatū-Whanganui
Railway stations opened in 1886
Railway stations closed in 1986